= Sewaniya =

- village
- Location within Madhya Pradesh Location within India
- Coordinates: 23.110034°N 77.468492°E
- Country: India
- State: Madhya Pradesh
- District: Bhopal
- Tehsil: Huzur

Population (2011)
  - Total: 128
- Time zone: UTC+5:30 (IST)
- ISO 3166 code: MP-IN
- Census code: 482537

Sewaniya is a village in the Bhopal district of Madhya Pradesh, India. It is located in the Huzur tehsil and the Phanda block.

== Demographics ==
According to the 2011 census of India, Sewaniya has 26 households. The effective literacy rate (i.e. the literacy rate of population excluding children aged 6 and below) is 79.25%.

Demographics (2011 Census)
| | Total | Male | Female |
|---|---|---|---|
| Population | 128 | 59 | 69 |
| Children aged below 6 years | 22 | 10 | 12 |
| Scheduled caste | 19 | 9 | 10 |
| Scheduled tribe | 12 | 6 | 6 |
| Literates | 84 | 44 | 40 |
| Workers (all) | 66 | 35 | 31 |
| Main workers (total) | 8 | 7 | 1 |
| Main workers: Cultivators | 5 | 4 | 1 |
| Main workers: Agricultural labourers | 1 | 1 | 0 |
| Main workers: Household industry workers | 0 | 0 | 0 |
| Main workers: Other | 2 | 2 | 0 |
| Marginal workers (total) | 58 | 28 | 30 |
| Marginal workers: Cultivators | 9 | 8 | 1 |
| Marginal workers: Agricultural labourers | 47 | 20 | 27 |
| Marginal workers: Household industry workers | 0 | 0 | 0 |
| Marginal workers: Others | 2 | 0 | 2 |
| Non-workers | 62 | 24 | 38 |
